Ambatomifanongoa is a town and commune in Madagascar. It belongs to the district of Ambatofinandrahana, which is a part of Amoron'i Mania Region. The population of the commune was estimated to be approximately 10,000 in 2001 commune census.

Only primary schooling is available. The majority 99% of the population of the commune are farmers.  The most important crops are rice and beans; also maize is an important agricultural product. Services provide employment for 0.8% of the population. Additionally fishing employs 0.2% of the population.

References and notes 

Populated places in Amoron'i Mania